Von List is a surname of German origin. Notable people with this surname include:

 Guido Karl Anton List (1848-1919), Austrian occultist, journalist, novelist and member of the Thule Society
 Wilhelm von List (1880-1971), German field marshal during the World War II

See also 
 List (surname)

German-language surnames